Pharus is a genus of medium-sized saltwater clams, littoral bivalve molluscs in the family Pharidae.

Taxonomy
Established without included species (nomen nudum) by Gray, 1840 in "Synopsis of the contents of the British Museum, ed. 42, first printing". Hence, often attributed to Leach in Brown, 1844. However, Vokes (1980) cites Gray, 1840 ["Synopsis of the contents of the British Museum, ed. 42a, second printing"] as the first valid use.

Species
 Pharus chenui Cosel, 1993
 Pharus legumen (Linnaeus, 1758)

References

 Vokes, H. E. 1980. Genera of the Bivalvia: a systematic and bibliographic catalogue (revised and updated). Paleontological Research Institution. Ithaca. US

External links
 Forbes, E. & Hanley, S. C. (1848-1853). A history of British Mollusca and their shells. 

Pharidae
Bivalve genera